David E. Van Kesteren (born October 7, 1955) is a Canadian politician. A member of the Conservative Party of Canada, he was the member of the House of Commons for the riding of Chatham-Kent—Leamington (known as Chatham-Kent—Essex until 2015) from the 2006 election until 2019.

A child of Dutch parents (his father was born in Noordwijk, his mother in Schoonhoven), Van Kesteren was born two years after his parents emigrated to Canada. Van Kesteren, who is married and has eight children and twenty one grandchildren, owns a Hyundai car dealership, Van Kesteren Auto Sales, which he founded in 1987. He is a charter member of the Chatham Sunrise Rotary Club and past president of the Chatham Christian Business Association.

First elected in the 2006 federal election, Van Kesteren defeated Liberal candidate Jim Comiskey by 5,616 votes in the then riding of Chatham-Kent—Essex.  Previously, Van Kesteren had narrowly lost the 2004 election to Liberal incumbent Jerry Pickard by only 407 votes.

Electoral record

References

External links
 DaveVanKesteren.ca

 How'd They Vote? Dave Van Kesteren's Voting History and Quotes

1955 births
Conservative Party of Canada MPs
Living people
Members of the House of Commons of Canada from Ontario
Members of the Christian and Missionary Alliance
People from Chatham-Kent
Canadian evangelicals
Canadian people of Dutch descent
21st-century Canadian politicians